Phil Cancik (born April 19, 1957) is a former American football linebacker. He played for the New York Giants in 1980 and for the Kansas City Chiefs in 1981.

References

1957 births
Living people
American football linebackers
Northern Arizona Lumberjacks football players
New York Giants players
Kansas City Chiefs players
Denver Gold players